Peniel is a small village in Carmarthenshire, Wales.

Villages in Carmarthenshire